Haris Silajdžić (born 1 October 1945) is a Bosnian politician and academic who served as the 5th Bosniak member of the Presidency of Bosnia and Herzegovina from 2006 to 2010. He was the 3rd Prime Minister of the Republic of Bosnia and Herzegovina from 1993 to 1996.  

Silajdžić was born in Breza in 1945. During the Bosnian War, he served as Minister of Foreign Affairs of the Republic of Bosnia and Herzegovina from 1990 to 1993, and later as Prime Minister. In the height of the war, he was one of the most influential Bosnian officials and a close ally of the country's first president, Alija Izetbegović. From 1994 until 1996, Silajdžić served as the 1st Prime Minister of the Federation of Bosnia and Herzegovina. After his term as Federal Prime Minister ended, Silajdžić was appointed Co-chairman of the Council of Ministers of Bosnia and Herzegovina in 1997, serving until 2000.

At the 2006 general election, he was elected Bosniak member of the Bosnian Presidency. Silajdžić served as member until 2010, after losing his bid for re-election at the 2010 general election. Originally, a prominent member of Alija Izetbegović's Party of Democratic Action, Silajdžić left the party in 1996 to establish the Party for Bosnia and Herzegovina (SBiH). As both president of SBiH and Presidency member, he took part in many constitutional reform talks, most notably in those regarding the 2006 April package, a compromise proposal for constitutional amendments which included, among other things, an individual president indirectly elected by Parliament, as opposed to being directly elected by popular vote. Silajdžić served as SBiH's president until 2012.

Early political career
 

From 1990 to 1993, during the Bosnian War, Silajdžić served as the first Minister of Foreign Affairs of the Republic of Bosnia and Herzegovina and as the Prime Minister from October 1993 to January 1996. Originally, he was a member and vice-president of the Party of Democratic Action (SDA), but broke away from the party in 1996 by funding his own Party for Bosnia and Herzegovina (SBiH). His SBiH entered the Parliamentary Assembly of Bosnia and Herzegovina and become one of the leading Bosnian Muslim parties the following year. Also from 31 May 1994 to 31 January 1996, Silajdžić served as the first Prime Minister of the Federation of Bosnia and Herzegovina.

During the war, he was a strong ally and type of a consultant of Alija Izetbegović, the first and only president of the Republic of Bosnia and Herzegovina.

After the end of the war, on 3 January 1997, he was appointed to the position of Co-chairman of the Council of Ministers of Bosnia and Herzegovina, serving alongside Boro Bosić and Svetozar Mihajlović until 6 June 2000.

At the 2000 parliamentary election, the SBiH formed a coalition with the Social Democratic Party, a party led by former wartime deputy prime minister Zlatko Lagumdžija, to gain the majority and force the nationalist parties out of power. They gathered a coalition of many other small parties to create the "Alliance for Change". The coalition government facilitated the passage of the Election Law, which was not only an important step towards democracy, but also a prerequisite to Bosnia and Herzegovina's accession to the Council of Europe. The SDP BiH and the SBiH led the government until the October 2002 general election, when the public, dissatisfied at the pace of political reform, elected the nationalist parties back into power.

Presidency (2006–2010)

Silajdžić had a strong political comeback in the 2006 general election, by getting 62.8% of the votes and getting elected as the 5th Bosniak member of the Presidency of Bosnia and Herzegovina.

In 2007, the International Court of Justice in the Hague acquitted Serbia of the charges of complicity in genocide brought against the "Federal Republic of Yugoslavia" by the Bosnian government. Silajdžić expressed disappointment at the court's ruling, but welcomed the fact that the court "ruled that Serbia and Montenegro had violated the Genocide Convention by not preventing or punishing the perpetrators of the genocide."

Silajdžić was a member of the Bosnian delegation which negotiated the US-brokered Dayton Agreement. He continued stressing that the document was essential in ending the genocide in Bosnia and Herzegovina, but later saw it as an obstacle in reunifying the country. Making strong steps and claims in 2006 and 2007 towards canceling certain parts of the Dayton Agreement, Silajdžić directly opposed the constitution of the country, thus being a very controversial political figure, famous on the Bosniak and infamous on the Serbian side. His main goals were abolishing the existence of Republika Srpska, breaking certain relations with Serbia and reforming the country towards unity.

During his four-year term as Presidency member, Silajdžić was backed by authorities and organizations throughout Bosnia and Herzegovina that voiced dissatisfaction with the Dayton Agreement provisions and opposed the autonomy of the Republika Srpska entity within Bosnia and Herzegovina.

Constitutional reform

 

The 2005 Opinion of the Venice Commission, an advisory body of the Council of Europe, which coincided with the 10th anniversary of the Dayton Agreement opened the debate on a constitutional reform in Bosnia and Herzegovina, on the impulse of U.S. diplomacy, with a view of modernizing the country's institutions.

The U.S. Ambassador Douglas L. McElhaney in Sarajevo and Ambassador Donald Hays in Washington led the U.S. talks with party leaders and the initiative to draft a compromise proposal for constitutional amendments, dubbed the April Package (aprilski paket). Overall, the April Package would have better defined and partly expanded State competences, and streamlined institutions, partly limiting the veto powers of ethnic groups. The amended Constitution would have included, among other things, an individual President (with two deputies, one for each constituent people, to rotate every 16 months instead of 8), indirectly elected by Parliament with a more ceremonial role, and a reinforced Chairman of the Council of Ministers.

At the moment of Parliamentary approval, the constitutional amendments failed by 2 votes, only gathering 26 MPs in favour over 42, instead of the required 28. This was due to the maximalist pre-electoral positions taken by Silajdžić's SBiH (wishing to abolish also entity voting) and by the Croatian Democratic Union 1990 (HDZ 1990) splinter party, who felt the proposal did not sufficiently protect the Bosnian Croats. The U.S. would try to rescue the April Package by facilitating further talks in 2007 between Milorad Dodik (now in power in Republika Srpska) and Silajdžić (now a member of the Presidency), but to no avail.

2010 general election

In the 2010 general election, Silajdžić decided to run for a second term in the Presidency, but failed to do so when election day came, getting only 25.10% of the votes, 5% less than Fahrudin Radončić and 9% less than elected Bakir Izetbegović, the son of Alija Izetbegović.

Personal life
Silajdžić has been married to former Bosnian pop singer Selma Muhedinović since 2016, after he had reportedly been in a relationship with her for over fifteen years. Silajdžić said that their mutual tendency towards art, his being poetry and hers being music, was what initially sparked their attraction. They live in Sarajevo.

Health
On 27 May 2020, Silajdžić underwent a successful open heart surgery in Sarajevo after he decided to have surgery due to the worsening situation with his blood vessels in his heart.

Awards and honours
In July 1995, Silajdžić was conferred the Croatian Order of Duke Trpimir.

In 2005, he received a Doctorate in International Relations honoris causa by the Geneva School of Diplomacy and International Relations. In 2018, Silajdžić was conferred Sitara-e-Pakistan for his services to Pakistan by the president of Pakistan, Mamnoon Hussain.

Orders
 Order of Duke Trpimir: 1995
 Sitara-e-Pakistan: 2018

References
Notes

Books

External links

Interview from the BBC's Hardtalk current affairs program
An interview with Haris Silajdžić
Haris Silajdžić interview with Tim Sebastian
Bosnia's new leadership takes shape

1945 births
Living people
Bosniaks of Bosnia and Herzegovina
Bosnia and Herzegovina Sunni Muslims
Bosniak politicians
Party of Democratic Action politicians
Party for Bosnia and Herzegovina politicians
Politicians of the Bosnian War
Foreign ministers of Bosnia and Herzegovina
Prime ministers of the Federation of Bosnia and Herzegovina
Members of the Presidency of Bosnia and Herzegovina
Chairmen of the Presidency of Bosnia and Herzegovina
Recipients of the Sitara-e-Pakistan